The New York Herald was a large-distribution newspaper based in New York City that existed between 1835 and 1924.  At that point it was acquired by its smaller rival the New-York Tribune to form the New York Herald Tribune.

History

The first issue of the paper was published by James Gordon Bennett Sr., on May 6, 1835. The Herald distinguished itself from the partisan papers of the day by the policy that it published in its first issue: "We shall support no party—be the agent of no faction or coterie, and we care nothing for any election, or any candidate from president down to constable." Bennett pioneered the "extra" edition during the Herald'''s sensational coverage of the Robinson–Jewett murder case.

By 1845 it was the most popular and profitable daily newspaper in the United States. In 1861 it circulated 84,000 copies and called itself "the most largely circulated journal in the world." Bennett stated that the function of a newspaper "is not to instruct but to startle and amuse." His politics tended to be anti-Catholic and he had tended to favor the "Know Nothing" faction. But he was not so anti-immigrant as the Know-Nothing Native American Party. During the American Civil War, Bennett's  policy, as expressed by the newspaper, was to staunchly support the Democratic Party. Frederic Hudson served as managing editor of the paper from 1846 to 1866. During the mid-19th century, the New York Herald adopted a proslavery stance, with Bennett arguing that the Compromise of 1850 would lead to "but little anxiety entertained in relation to the question of slavery, the public mind will be so fatigued that it will be disinclined to think of the matter any further."

In April 1867 Bennett turned over control of the paper to his son James Gordon Bennett Jr. Under James Jr., the paper financed Henry Morton Stanley's expeditions into Africa to find explorer David Livingstone, where they met on November 10, 1871. The paper also supported Stanley's trans-Africa exploration. In 1879 it supported the ill-fated expedition of George W. De Long to the Arctic region.

In 1874 the Herald ran the New York Zoo hoax,Connery, T. B. (June 3, 1893). A Famous Newspaper Hoax, Harper's Weekly, p. 534 in which the front page of the newspaper was devoted entirely to a fabricated story of wild animals getting loose at the Central Park Zoo and attacking numerous people.

On October 4, 1887, Bennett Jr. sent Julius Chambers to Paris, France, to launch its European Edition. Later he moved to Paris himself, but the New York Herald suffered from his attempt to manage its operation in New York by telegram. In 1916 a Saturday issue of the paper reported that a major financier was found dead from poisoning; it added that in 1901 he was "mysteriously poisoned and narrowly escaped death."

After Bennett Jr. died in 1918, Frank Munsey acquired control of the New York Herald (including its European Edition). In 1924 Munsey sold the paper to the family of Ogden Reid, owners of the New-York Tribune, creating the New York Herald Tribune (and the International Herald Tribune with a divergent future).

When the Herald was still under the authority of its original publisher Bennett Sr., it was considered to be the most intrusive and sensationalist of the leading New York papers. Its ability to entertain the public with timely daily news made it the leading circulation paper of its period.

European edition

During the time of original publisher Bennett, the New York Herald was perhaps the best-known American paper in Europe. Its first issue came out on October 4, 1887. The official name of the paper on its front page masthead was The New York Herald European Edition—Paris.  But it became widely known as simply the Paris Herald.  

Publisher Bennett Jr. referred to the paper as a "village publication" for the circle of people in Paris who were interested in international news. Indeed, during its first decades of publication a feature of the paper was a list of every American known to be in Paris at the time, culled from inspections of hotel registries. Even as the paper's audience grew, most of its readers were in France or countries near France.

The European edition consistently lost money into the 1910s. As the time of Paris in World War I began, Bennett Jr. kept the paper running, even during the First Battle of the Marne when some French papers shut down. When the American Expeditionary Forces began arriving in France in 1917, demand for the Paris Herald soared, with eventually some 350,000 copies being printed each day and the edition finally becoming profitable.

The European edition subsequently became a mainstay of American expatriate culture in Europe. In Ernest Hemingway's novel, The Sun Also Rises (1926), the first thing the novel's protagonist Jake Barnes does on returning from Spain to France is buy the New York Herald from a kiosk in Bayonne in the Basses-Pyrénées department and read it at a café.

Evening Telegram
The New York Evening Telegram was founded in 1867 by the junior Bennett, and was considered by many to be an evening edition of the Herald. Frank Munsey acquired the Telegram in 1920 and ended its connection to the Herald.

Commemorated

New York's Herald Square is named after the New York Herald newspaper. 
The New York Herald Building was designed by the prestigious firm of Stanford White, and completed in 1908. It occupied the north side of the square. At its top was a sculpture commemorating the Bennetts. The statue of Minerva, the Bellringers, and Owls, by Antonin Carles, sounded every hour with bellringing.
After the building was demolished in 1921 to make way for other development, the sculpture was installed on the north side of Herald Square, and the sound was stopped.
The chorus of "Give My Regards to Broadway" includes the phrase "[R]emember me to Herald Square." North of Herald Square is Times Square, which is named after the rival The New York Times.

 See also 
 Porter Cornelius Bliss
 New York Herald Tribune (successor to the New York Herald'')

References

External links

The New York Herald 1842-1920 Many Editions Digitized Online at The Library of Congress
Three months with the New York Herald: or, Old news on board of a homeward ... by John Henry Potter
 Photographs and architectural sketches of the New York Herald Building
 A winter evening in a crowded Herald Square at the New York Herald Building, oil on board painting

 
American penny papers
Newspapers established in 1835
Publications disestablished in 1924
Defunct newspapers published in New York City
1835 establishments in New York (state)
1924 disestablishments in New York (state)
Daily newspapers published in New York City